Rishon Bhadain born on August 17, 1998, is a Mauritian politician.

Political career
On November 23, 2020, Rishon Bhadain was elected with 767 votes for the village elections in Albion, Mauritius.

References

External links 
 
 

Living people
Mauritian politicians
1998 births
21st-century Mauritian lawyers
Mauritian Hindus
Mauritian people of Indian descent